"Free Four" is a song by the English rock band Pink Floyd, written by Roger Waters and released on the band's 1972 album Obscured by Clouds.

Recording and lyrics 
The song begins with a rock and roll count-in, but in this case Pink Floyd decided to play with words and record, "One, Two, Free Four!" The song deals with reflection of one's life, the "evils" of the record industry, and also makes a reference to Roger Waters' father who was killed in World War 2. The music begins in an upbeat manner, while the lyrics tell a very cynical and somewhat depressing story. "Free Four" was released as a single in the U.S. in 1972 but did not chart.

the song charted at number 29 in Netherlands and 35 in Wallonia (Belgium)

Cashbox reviewed the single saying "Would you believe a happy song about death?"

Track listing

Personnel 
 David Gilmour – acoustic and electric guitars, handclapping
 Nick Mason – drums, tambourine, handclapping
 Roger Waters – double-tracked lead vocals, backing vocals, bass
 Richard Wright – EMS VCS 3

References 

https://www.ultratop.be/fr/song/9bfe/Pink-Floyd-Free-Four
https://dutchcharts.nl/showitem.asp?interpret=Pink+Floyd&titel=Free+Four&cat=s

External links 

 [ AMG song review]

Pink Floyd songs
1972 singles
Harvest Records singles
Protest songs
Songs about music
Songs inspired by deaths
Songs written by Roger Waters
Song recordings produced by David Gilmour
Song recordings produced by Roger Waters
Song recordings produced by Richard Wright (musician)
Song recordings produced by Nick Mason
British folk rock songs